Daniel Rosen (born February 14, 1963) is an American comedian, juggler and game show announcer.

He began his career with unicycle, juggling and magic acts in high school. Johnny Carson discovered Rosen when he was a teen and made him a regular guest on The Tonight Show Starring Johnny Carson. This exposure and Carson's endorsement led him to be the announcer and writer on The Late Show.

Rosen's comedy has taken him on the road with Robin Williams, Billy Crystal, Roseanne Barr, and Bette Midler. He also played the role of Eddie Greene on Nash Bridges and served as the musical director and announcer on David Strassman's eponymous UK talk show Strassman.

The producers of The Price Is Right asked Rosen to be one of several announcers on the show after the death of Rod Roddy in 2003. In addition, Rosen is one of the three announcers for The Price Is Right Live!, a live stage show based on the television game show and held at Harrah's casinos.

In 2013, Daniel launched Credit Repair Cloud, a software for the credit repair industry. In September of 2021, the Consumer Financial Protection Bureau filed a federal lawsuit against Rosen and Credit Repair Cloud for violating telemarketing laws in addition to violating the CFPA for enabling his clients to illegally charge advance fees for Credit Repair Services.

References

External links
Daniel Rosen at Internet Movie Database
Daniel Rosen Site 

American stand-up comedians
Game show announcers
Living people
Jugglers
American business executives
1963 births